The Rome–Civita Castellana–Viterbo railway is a regional railway line connecting Rome, Italy, with Viterbo, capital city of the Province of Viterbo.

Route 
  Piazzale Flaminio ↔ Viterbo

The Roma Nord, a radial route, has its urban terminus at Piazzale Flaminio, on the northern perimeter of Rome's city centre.  From there, it runs in a northerly direction, parallel to the Via Flaminia, as far as Civita Castellana, and then to its ultimate destination, Viterbo. Locally, it is derisively referred to as the "Freccia Viterbese".

See also 

 History of rail transport in Italy
 List of railway stations in Lazio
 Rail transport in Italy
 Transport in Rome

References

External links

 ATAC – official site 
 ATAC map – schematic depicting all routes in the Rome railway network

This article is based upon a translation of the Italian-language version as at November 2012.

Railway lines in Lazio
Transport in Rome
Railway lines opened in 1932